This was the first edition of the tournament.

Maxime Cressy won the title after defeating Matthias Bachinger 6–4, 6–2 in the final.

Seeds

Draw

Finals

Top half

Bottom half

References

External links
Main draw
Qualifying draw

Città di Forlì II - 1